Three Mile Island  is the Three Mile Island Nuclear Generating Station in eastern Pennsylvania.

Three Mile Island also may refer to:

Matters related to the Three Mile Island plant:
Three Mile Island accident, a partial core meltdown occurring in 1979
Three Mile Island accident health effects
 Books:
Three Mile Island: Thirty Minutes to Meltdown (1982)
 Three Mile Island (video game), a 1979 simulation game for the Apple II
 Three Mile Island (Lake Winnipesaukee), an island in New Hampshire, United States

See also

The China Syndrome